The men's shot put at the 2011 IPC Athletics World Championships was held at the QEII Stadium from 22–29 January.

In the Men's shot put F42, held on January 27, the Bronze was originally won by Fanie Lombaard of South Africa. However, he tested positive for Probenecid in a urine sample provided on 27 January 2011. The prohibited substance had been prescribed to him because of a medical problem, but he did not have a Therapeutic Use Exemption (TUE). The International Paralympic Committee (IPC) suspended him for a year (from January 27), and fined him 1,500 euros. The IPC redistributed the medals.

Medalists

F11
The Men's shot put, F11 was held on January 24

F11 = visual impairment: may range from no light perception in either eye to light perception with the inability to recognise the shape of a hand at any distance or in any direction.

Results

Final

Key:  SB = Season Best

F12
The Men's shot put, F12 was held on January 22 with the medal ceremony on January 23

F12 = visual impairment: may have the ability to recognise the shape of a hand, have a visual acuity of 2/60 and/or visual field of less than 5 degrees.

Results

Final

Key:  AR = Asian Record

F20
The Men's shot put, F20 was held on January 29

F20 = intellectual disability.

Results

Final

Key:  WR = World Record

F32/33
The Men's shot put, F32/33 was held on January 22

F32/33:
F32 = poor functional strength in arms, legs and trunk, able to propel a wheelchair, compete in a wheelchair and may throw a club or discus from a throwing frame. 
F33 = some degree of trunk movement when pushing a wheelchair, forward trunk movement is limited during forceful pushing, throwing movements are mainly from the arm, compete in a wheelchair or from a throwing frame.

Results

Final

Key:  WR = World Record

F34
The Men's shot put, F34 was held on January 22

F34 = good functional strength with minimal limitation or control problems in the arms or trunk, compete in a wheelchair or from a throwing frame.

Results

Final

Key:  WR = World Record, AR = Asian Record

F35/36
The Men's shot put, F35/36 was held on January 23

F35/36:
F35 = good static balance, problems in dynamic balance, may need assistive devices for walking but not when standing or throwing, may have sufficient lower extremity function to execute a run up when throwing. 
F36 = walk without assistance or assistive devices, have more control problems with upper than lower limbs. All four limbs are involved, dynamic often better than static balance. Hand control, grasp and release are affected when throwing.

Results

Final

Key:  WR = World Record, AR = Asian Record, SB = Season Best

F37/38
The Men's shot put, F37/38 was held on January 27

F37 = spasticity in an arm and leg on the same side, good functional ability on the non impaired side, better development, good arm and hand control and follow through. 
F38 = meet the minimum disability criteria for athletes with cerebral palsy, head injury or stroke.

Results

Final

Key:  WR = World Record, AR = Area Record, SB = Season Best

F40
The Men's shot put, F40 was held on January 25

F40 =  dwarfism.

Results

Final

Key:  WR = World Record, AR = Area Record, SB = Season Best

F42
The Men's shot put, F42 was held on January 25

F42 = single above knee amputation or equivalent impairments.

Results

Final

Key:  CR = Championship Record, AR = Area Record, SB = Season Best

F44/46
The Men's shot put, F44/46 was held on January 28

F44/46:
F44 = single below knee amputation or equivalent impairments.
F46 = single above or below elbow amputation or equivalent impairments.

The Men's shot put F44/46 also include classification F43: single above knee amputation or equivalent impairments.

Results

Final

{| class="wikitable sortable" style="text-align:center"
|-
! Rank !!  Athlete !! Nationality !! #1 !! #2 !! #3 !!  #4 !! #5 !! #6 !! Result !! Points !! Notes
|-
|  ||align=left| Jackie Christiansen ||align=left|   || 15.81 || 17.79 || 17.21 || 16.99 || 17.01 ||  || 17.79 || 995 || CR
|-
|  ||align=left| Miltiadis Kyriakidis ||align=left|   || 13.10 || 13.64 || 13.35 ||  || 13.94 || 14.12 || 14.12 || 747 || SB
|-
|  ||align=left| Josip Slivar ||align=left|   || 13.80 ||  || 13.68 ||  ||  || 14.05 || '14.05'' || 740 || 
|-  
|  ||align=left| Soselito Sekeme ||align=left|   || 13.82 || 13.70 || 14.01 || 14.09 || 14.52 || 13.96 || 14.52 || 736 || =CR
|-  
|  ||align=left| Enlong Wei ||align=left|   || 14.19 || 13.05 || 14.47 || 13.88 ||  ||  || 14.47 || 731 || SB
|-  
|  ||align=left| Tomasz Rebisz ||align=left|   ||  || 13.80 ||  || 13.96 || 14.03 || 14.20 || 14.20 || 706 || 
|-  
|  ||align=left| Alexander Filatov ||align=left|   ||  ||  || 13.08 ||  || 13.60 ||  || 13.60 || 697 || 
|-  
|  ||align=left| Alexey Ladnyy ||align=left|   || 13.20 || 13.13 || 13.25 ||  || 12.85 ||  || 13.25 || 662 || 
|-  
|  ||align=left| Xiufeng Gong ||align=left|   || 13.18 ||  || 13.32 ||  ||  ||  || 13.32 || 619 || 
|-  
| 10 ||align=left| Zhanbiao Hou ||align=left|   || 12.76 ||  || 13.18 ||  ||  ||  || 13.18 || 605 || 
|-  
| 11 ||align=left| Maamar Meskine ||align=left|   || 10.40 || 10.92 || 11.40 ||  ||  ||  || 11.40 || 408 || 
|}Key:  CR = Championship Record, =CR = Equal Championship Record, SB = Season Best

F52/53
The Men's shot put, F52/53 was held on January 24

F52/53:
F52 = good shoulder, elbow and wrist function, poor to normal finger flexion and extension, no trunk or leg function. 
F53 = normal upper limb function, no abdominal, leg or lower spinal function.

Results

FinalKey:  WR = World Record, SB = Season Best, NM = No Mark

F54/55/56
The Men's shot put, F54/55/56 was held on January 26

F54/55/56:
F54 = normal upper limb function, no abdominal or lower spinal function. 
F55 = normal upper limb function, may have partial to almost completely normal trunk function, no leg function.
F56 = normal upper limb and trunk function, some leg function, high bilateral above knee amputation.

Results

FinalKey:  CR = Championship Record, AR = Area Record, SB = Season Best

F57/58
The Men's shot put, F57/58 was held on January 24

F57/58:
F57 = normal upper limb and trunk function, may have bilateral above knee amputations. 
F58 = normal upper limb and trunk function, a bilateral below knee amputation or single above knee amputation.

Results

FinalKey''':  WR = World Record, CR = Championship Record, AR = Area Record, SB = Season Best, NM = No Mark

See also
List of IPC world records in athletics

References
General
Schedule and results, Official site of the 2011 IPC Athletics World Championships
IPC Athletics Classification Explained, Scottish Disability Sport
Specific

Shot put
Shot put at the World Para Athletics Championships